The State Key Laboratories is strong group of university and research institution laboratories receiving funding and administrative support from the central government of the People's Republic of China.

These labs often specialize in areas such as:
Chemistry
Mathematics and Physics
Geology
Biotechnology
Information technology
Materials science
Engineering
Medicine
According to the Ministry of Science and Technology of China, as of 2017, there were 253 State Key Laboratories approved in China.

The following lists the 71 universities with at least one state key laboratory:

Most of the universities with SKL are Double First Class Universities approved by the central government of People's Republic of China.

See also

List of universities in China
Double First Class University Plan
OpenCourseWare in China
China Open Resources for Education

References

External links
State Key Laboratories website archived from the original on 21 February 2009.

Research institutes in China